Dorin Recean (born 17 March 1974) is a Moldovan academic and politician serving as Prime Minister of Moldova since February 2023. He served as interior minister of Moldova from July 2012 to February 2015.

Early life and education
Recean was born in Dondușeni on 17 March 1974. In 1996, he graduated from the Academy of Economic Studies of Moldova with a bachelor's degree in international business management. Then he obtained a master's degree in business administration from Newport International University's Belgium branch in 2000.

Career
Recean started his career as a lecturer in 1995 at his alma mater, the Academy of Economic Studies, and continued to teach there until 2007. From 2002 to 2010 he also worked in different firms in various capacities. He also taught at the Chișinău-based Newport International University from 2000 to July 2012.

In January 2010 Recean was appointed deputy-minister of Information and Communication Technology (ICT), where he was responsible for implementing new secure documents, including the bio-metric passport, as part of the visa-liberalization action plan. He has been a member of the Governmental Task Force on Visa-liberalization with the EU.

In July 2012, he was appointed interior minister to the cabinet led by Vlad Filat, replacing Alexei Roibu. On 31 May 2013, Recean was reappointed interior minister to the cabinet led by Prime Minister  Iurie Leancă.

Immediately after the November 2014 elections, Recean announced he would pursue a private business career in FinTech. He is currently promoting ICT technologies in the field of mobile remittances and payments with the aim at broadening the access of migrant workers and their relatives to secure and affordable money transfers and payments.

Premiership 

In February 2023, Recean was appointed prime minister of Moldova, following the resignation of prime minister Natalia Gavrilița.

Political views 
Recean supports Moldovan membership of the EU and closer ties with the West. He declared after his prime minister nomination: "The new government will have three priorities: Order and discipline, a new life and economy, and peace and stability. The new government will continue the implementation of Moldova's strategic course – integration into the European Union."

Personal life
Recean is married and has two children. He speaks English, French, and Russian in addition to his native Romanian.

See also
List of international prime ministerial trips made by Dorin Recean

References

1974 births
Living people
Academic staff of the Academy of Economic Studies of Moldova
Moldovan Ministers of the Interior
People from Dondușeni District
Prime Ministers of Moldova